is a fictional character in the Soulcalibur series of video games. Created by Namco's Project Soul division, he first appeared in Soul Edge, and later in all games of the Soulcalibur series with the exception of Soulcalibur Legends. His likeness has been used for merchandise related to the series, ranging from plush toys to action figures. Voldo has no spoken dialogue in any title in the series, instead moaning or hissing deeply while fighting an opponent.

Character design
As a character introduced in Soul Edge, Voldo's weapons, dual hand katars designed to be unique amongst the other weapons in the game, were selected before other elements of the character. His design and concept were then built to revolve around it, starting with gender, then physical measurements, and lastly background details. During Voldo's development, several alternate designs were considered, ranging from a balding, long haired man with a goatee to a rich nobleman wielding a katar on his right hand and a sickle in his left. After his appearance and movement were fleshed out by a concept artist, his character was rendered as a 3D model by a design team that worked solely on him. During this phase the team additionally worked with the Soul Edge story creators, refining the character's own role in the plot as needed throughout development.

Unlike other characters in the series, a majority of Voldo's movements were created from Naotake Hirata's imagination and not motion capture. However the head of Team Soul's motion capture department, Kento Kojima, noticed one particular actor working with them was highly flexible and able to mimic Voldo. Impressed, Kojima utilized him in motion capture sessions for some of the character's animations for Soulcalibur III, stating in a later interview, "I was astonished that a human being could actually move like that. It left quite an impression on me. You probably can't tell which part is motion capture and what was just animated by hand by our animator."

In video games 

Voldo was the right-hand man of Italian weapons merchant Vercci, also known as the Merchant of Death. Vercci desired Soul Edge to form part of his collection of rare weapons, and Voldo stood as the head of the expeditions in his search, even contracting the services of the feared Spanish Captain Cervantes de Leon, and later accompanied Vercci when he decided to take the search personally. When word came that the Italian Wars broke on Italy and that Vercci's possessions were the first targets, Vercci became angry and moved his fleet, his only remaining possession, to an uninhabited island off the coast of Sicily. After construction of Vercci's vault was completed, Voldo was instructed to slay the sailors who had helped in the construction to prevent the location of Vercci's Money Pit being revealed. Voldo would remain sealed underground, becoming blind and insane in the process. He became the guardian of the tomb and began slaying those who ventured to steal, leading to rumors of the island, its treasures, and its "ghost guardian" spread around the globe. Years later, Voldo would hear his master's voice commanding him to search for Soul Edge once again, making him leave the tomb.

In the sequel Soulcalibur, Voldo's search for Soul Edge ended in failure, and he returned to find the Money Pit flooded by a storm. After saving what he could, Voldo remained in the vault, later to reemerge from the pit following a woman with the essence of Soul Edge, Ivy, who tried to find leads on the sword for herself. In Soulcalibur II,  Voldo returns to the Money Pit after taking Yoshimitsu's katana, mistaking it for Soul Edge due to its evil aura. Voldo realized it was not Soul Edge and set outside on a new search, collecting its fragments along the way.

His profile in Soulcalibur III reveals that during one of his periodic visits to the Pit, Voldo found the tomb ransacked and the sword he mistook for Soul Edge stolen alongside the fragments he collected in his travels. Since the thieves were apparently interested in Soul Edge, he decided to track them down and force them to reveal any information they may possess regarding the sword. He also came to realize he was eventually going to die and leave the pit unprotected, so he began to search for a worthy successor as well. During the events leading up to Soulcalibur IV, Voldo managed to locate Soul Edge at Ostrheinsburg, resting in the hands of the Azure Knight.  After finally claiming Soul Edge for his master, a familiar voice spoke to him, instructing him to protect Soul Edge.  However, the voice belonged not to Vercci, but Soul Edge, which assumed his form in Voldo's mind. But after he was set free from this illusion, Voldo returned to the pit to find it ransacked. He then went on a rampage and murdered every thief to return the treasures. Seventeen years later, Voldo once again served Nightmare, who had disguised himself as Graf Dumas.
In the new timeline of Soulcalibur VI, Voldo ruthlessly guarded Vercci's collection but ventured out of the Money Pit to retrieve his master's notes that were stolen by Ivy.

Promotion and reception
In August 2003, Todd McFarlane Productions released a Voldo sculpture amongst a set of five based on characters from Soulcalibur II. The immobile figure was modeled after his primary outfit and stood six inches tall with a base. In 2006, Namco released a Voldo figurine as part of a Soulcalibur III set based upon his promotional artwork for the game. While not posable, the PVC figure came with three interchangeable weapons for it to hold; an alternate color version was later released in a secondary set.

Voldo's attire and unusual fighting style has been a source of discussion regarding the character by several sources. In the book Trigger Happy, Steven Poole described him as "a triumph of iconic or pictorial representation", contrasting him against abstract character Pac-Man. Game Chronicles described Voldo as "that guy is sick...in more ways than one." PlayStation Magazine described Voldo as "nothing if not the master of freakiness." Game Vortex reviewer Robert Perkins described him as "a warrior that can best be described as martial artist/contortionist meets Edward Scissorhands." Official U.S. PlayStation Magazine noted him in their "Characters with Character" article, citing him as a staff favorite but also for his bizarreness. The New York Times described him as "perhaps the oddest character ever to appear in this genre", noting similarity between his movements and a go-go dancer. The article later added after a discussion of his attire and weaponry "the character is a pastiche of every Satanist stereotype imaginable. Why isn't Jerry Falwell leading an anti-Soul Calibur campaign?"

In a 2002 poll by Namco prior to the release of Soul Calibur II regarding their favorite character, Voldo placed third, with 13% of the tally. Voldo placed fourth in UGO.com's "Top 11 SoulCalibur Fighters" article, stating, "Voldo is here because he's top-tier fighter who also happens to be a highly skilled contortionist and an S&M fetishist." IGN listed Voldo as one of the series' top ten fighters at number four, stating, "Voldo scares us. He isn't a man so much as a twisted mass of writhing muscle, all wrapped up and held together in 16th-Century bondage gear...Even a fighter who prepares for all possible opponents has taken Voldo's unique moveset into account." GameDaily ranked him number two on their "Top 10 Ugliest Game Characters" article, noting his lack of clothes and describing him as a "one-man freak show, plain and simple." In another article, they listed the "unorthodox fighter" as one of the top 25 video game archetypes, citing Voldo as an example of this due to his flamboyant style and difficult control. He was listed number five in Dutch gaming magazine Power Unlimiteds "Top 5 Characters to Spontaneously Cause Suicidal Tendencies" due to his appearance and high speed, unpredictable attacks. He was ranked first on UGO Networks's list of "25 Most Memorable Italians in Video Games". Complex listed the 20 best characters from the series, ranking him the fourth best character.

See also
Dance, Voldo, Dance, a machinima-based music video featuring the character.

References

Fictional assassins in video games
Fantasy video game characters
Fictional Italian people in video games
Fictional mute characters
Fictional blind characters
Fictional henchmen in video games
Fictional Asian martial arts practitioners
Fictional knife-fighters
Fictional servants
Fictional Sicilian people
Male characters in video games
Soulcalibur series characters
Video game characters introduced in 1995